The 1st Battalion, Virginia Infantry Regulars, also known as the Irish Battalion, was raised in Virginia for service in the Confederate States Army during the American Civil War and, served as infantry. It fought mostly with the Army of Northern Virginia.

The battalion was organized in May 1861, with men from the city of Richmond and Hanover County in five companies. It moved to western Virginia and participated in Lee's Cheat Mountain Campaign, then fought at First Kernstown, McDowell, and in Jackson's Valley Campaign. The unit was then assigned to General J.R. Jones' Brigade and was involved in many conflicts of the Army of Northern Virginia from the Seven Day's Battles to Fredericksburg. Later it was assigned to General Headquarters and in November 1864, Provost Guard.

It lost twenty-five percent of the 187 engaged at First Manassas, had 3 wounded during the Seven Days' Battles and 3 killed and 19 wounded at Second Manassas. The unit surrendered 18 officers and 120 men.

Majors D.B. Bridgford, John D. Munford, and John Seddon were in command.

See also

List of Virginia Civil War units

References

Furthwer reading
Driver, R. J., Ruffner, K. Conley. (1996). 1st Battalion Virginia Infantry, 39th Battalion Virginia Cavalry, 24th Battalion Virginia Partisan Rangers. Lynchburg, Va.: H.E. Howard.

External links
 The Civil War in the East: 1st Virginia Regular Infantry Battalion
 1st Battalion, Virginia Infantry (Regulars) (Irish Battalion), NPS

Units and formations of the Confederate States Army from Virginia
1861 establishments in Virginia
Military units and formations established in 1861
1865 disestablishments in Virginia
Military units and formations disestablished in 1865